This is a list of androgens/anabolic steroids (AAS) or testosterone derivatives. Esters are mostly not included in this list; for esters, see here instead. The major classes of testosterone derivatives include the following (as well as combinations thereof):

 Testosterone derivatives: direct derivatives of testosterone not falling into the groups below
 4,5α-Reduced/dihydrogenated testosterone derivatives: dihydrotestosterone (DHT) derivatives
 19-Demethylated testosterone derivatives: 19-nortestosterone (nandrolone) derivatives
 17α-Alkylated testosterone derivatives: methyltestosterone and ethyltestosterone derivatives
 17α-Ethynylated/vinylated testosterone derivatives: ethynyltestosterone (ethisterone) and vinyltestosterone derivatives

The last group consists of progestins with mostly only very weak androgenic/anabolic activity.

This article pertains to steroidal androgens; nonsteroidal androgens like the selective androgen receptor modulators (SARMs) andarine and enobosarm (ostarine) are not included here.

Testosterone derivatives

Prohormone-like

Prodrugs

Ethers

Dihydrotestosterone derivatives

Prohormone-like

Prodrugs

Ethers

Azine dimers

19-Nortestosterone (nandrolone) derivatives

Prohormone-like

Prodrugs

Esters

17α-Alkylated testosterone derivatives

Prohormone-like

Prodrugs

Ethers

17α-Alkylated dihydrotestosterone derivatives

Prodrugs

Azine dimers

17α-Alkylated 19-nortestosterone derivatives

Prohormone-like

Prodrugs

Esters

17α-Vinylated testosterone derivatives

17α-Vinylated 19-nortestosterone derivatives

Commentary
The 17α-ethenylated (vinylated) testosterone derivative norvinisterone (vinylnortestosterone) is much more potent as an AAS than the 17α-ethynylated testosterone derivatives and is intermediate in potency between the 17α-ethynylated progestins and conventional AAS, with approximately one-third and one-fifth of the respective androgenic and anabolic activity of nandrolone in animal bioassays.

Vinyltestosterone has been described as a weak AAS, though stronger than its 17α-ethynylated analogue ethisterone.

17α-Ethynylated testosterone derivatives

17α-Ethynylated 19-nortestosterone derivatives

Prodrugs

Ethers

Esters

Ethers and esters

Commentary
17α-Ethynylated testosterone derivatives are potent progestins with only very weak androgenic/anabolic activity and are used as oral contraceptives or for the treatment of gynecological conditions in women. They are invariably classified as progestins rather than as AAS. However, these progestins are testosterone derivatives and do have significant androgenic/anabolic activity, sometimes producing acne and other mild androgenic effects in women. Conversely, in men, these drugs may actually have functional antiandrogen effects due to their potent progestogenic and hence antigonadotropic activity and capacity to suppress gonadal testosterone production.

See also
 List of steroids
 List of designer drugs § Androgens
 List of androgens/anabolic steroids available in the United States

Notes
? = Chemical names that are unverified.

References

Further reading
 
 
 

Androgens and anabolic steroids
Steroids
Androgens anabolic steroids